Nepheloploce is a genus of moths of the family Tortricidae. It contains only one species, Nepheloploce nephelopyrga, which is found in the Democratic Republic of the Congo.

Etymology

References

Moths described in 1938
Olethreutini
Monotypic moth genera
Moths of Africa
Endemic fauna of the Democratic Republic of the Congo